Archie Hahn (sometimes credited as Archie Hahn III, born November 1, 1941) is an American character actor and improviser best known for his appearances on the British version of Whose Line is it Anyway? and the 1988 movie Police Academy 5: Assignment Miami Beach. He has also appeared in Phantom of the Paradise (1974), Pray TV (1980), This Is Spinal Tap (1984), Brewster's Millions (1985), The Brady Bunch Movie (1995), and many Joe Dante films including Amazon Women on the Moon (1987), Gremlins 2: The New Batch (1990) and Small Soldiers (1998). In two of his final appearances on Whose Line is it Anyway?, Hahn unexpectedly brought props to use as he improvised, first castanets and then a pair of false teeth.

Hahn attended AI DuPont HS in Wilmington, Delaware. 

Hahn has done similar work in the improv theater company, WAR BABIES.

Hahn was an early member of The Groundlings school and troupe of comedy acting.

Filmography

Phantom of the Paradise (1974) - The Juicy Fruits / The Beach Bums / The Undeads
The Sunshine Boys (1975) - Assistant at Audition
Cannonball (1976) - Zippo
It Happened One Christmas (1977) - Ernie
Pray TV (1980) - Fletcher Peebles
My Favorite Year (1982) - Delivery Boy / Featured Player
Off the Wall (1983) - Tank Driver
This Is Spinal Tap (1984) - Room Service Guy
Meatballs Part II (1984) - Jamie / Voice of Meathead
Protocol (1984) - T. V. Commentator
Brewster's Millions (1985) - Iceberg Man
Radioactive Dreams (1985) - Adult Chester (voice)
Children of a Lesser God (1986) - Announcer (voice)
Innerspace (1987) - Messenger
Amazon Women on the Moon (1987) - Harvey Pitnik (segment "Critic's Corner,' 'Roast Your Loved One")
Police Academy 5: Assignment Miami Beach (1988) - Mouse
The 'Burbs (1989) - Voice-Over Actor (voice)
Gremlins 2: The New Batch (1990) - Forster's Technician #1
Misery (1990) - Reporter #2 
Only You (1992) - Gentleman on Plane
Matinee (1993) - Shopping Cart Star
The Brady Bunch Movie (1995) - Mr. Swanson
Black Mask (1996) - (voice)
Alien Resurrection (1997) - Newborn Vocal #2 (voice)
Dr. Dolittle (1998) - Heavy Woman's Dog (voice)
Small Soldiers (1998) - Satellite Dish Installer
28 Days (2000) - Plant Shop Owner (uncredited)
Man of the Year (2002) - Nick
Eight Crazy Nights (2002) - TV Announcer (voice)
Nobody Knows Anything! (2003) - Youth Leader
Looney Tunes: Back in Action (2003) - Stunt Director
Racing Stripes (2005) - (voice)
Guess Who (2005) - Bellman 
Chicken Little (2005) - (voice)
John Tucker Must Die (2006) - Teacher In Thong #2
Barnyard (2006) - (voice)
Mr. Woodcock (2007) - Gym Teacher
Fly Me to the Moon (2008) - Fly Buddy #2 (voice)
Remembering Phil (2008) - Studio Sentry
Alvin and the Chipmunks: The Squeakquel (2009) - Agent
Burying the Ex (2014) - Chuck

References

External links

Living people
1941 births
People from Cape Coral, Florida
American male television actors
American male film actors
20th-century American male actors
21st-century American male actors